İstanbul Plak is a music publishing company of Turkey, established in 1963 and based in Unkapanı, Istanbul.

Contracted Artists

Current Artists

 Özlem Tekin
 Mirkelam
 Sertan
 Tarkan
 Ümit Sayın
 Zeynep Dizdar

Notable artists

 Ajda Pekkan
 Azize Gencebay
 Cengiz İmren
 Ebru Gündeş
 Edip Akbayram
 Erkin Koray
 Ertuğ
 İzzet Altınmeşe
 Metin Arolat
 Mine Koşan
 Nalan Tokyürek a.k.a. "Of Aman Nalan"
 Orhan Gencebay
 Osman Bayşu
 Salim Dündar
 Sevim Emre
 Teoman

References

External links
 Official site 

Turkish record labels
Record labels established in 1963